Donald Manson (born 1919) was a rugby league player who played for South Sydney on the wing from 1937 to 1939.

Rugby league career
He made his debut in round 1 of the 1937 season against University. In his first two matches he scored six tries, the last player to accomplish such a feat till Charlie Staines in 2020. By the start of the 1938 season, he was considered to "be on the up and up". He was the NSWRFL's leading try-scorer for the 1938 season, and that year he appeared for the New South Wales Blues.

During the 1939 season, Manson went on a tour to New Zealand as part of a side coached by Ray Stehr. After his return, South Sydney did not name him in their line-up for either their first, reserves or third side, a decision which was considered surprising by the Daily News. Manson played one further game in the South Sydney reserves, before subsequently leaving the club for Eastern Suburbs at the season's end. Manson retired from the NSWRFL after the 1941 season, and stopped playing league altogether for five years. He has the second best strike rate in the history of the NRL/ARL/NSWRFL, averaging 1.13 tries per game.

References

Australian rugby league players
South Sydney Rabbitohs players
Rugby league wingers
Rugby league players from Sydney
New South Wales rugby league team players
1919 births
Year of death missing